The 2021 Asian Women's Club Volleyball Championship  was the 21st edition of the Asian Women's Club Volleyball Championship, an annual international volleyball club tournament organized by the Asian Volleyball Confederation (AVC) with Thailand Volleyball Association (TVA). The tournament was held in Nakhon Ratchasima, Thailand, from 1 to 7 October 2021. The winner of the tournament qualified to 2021 FIVB Volleyball Women's Club World Championship.

The last edition of the tournament was held in 2019. The 2020 edition, due to be hosted in Tianjin, China. The hosting duties was moved to Thailand before the tournament was cancelled due to the COVID-19 pandemic.

Qualification
Following the AVC regulations, The maximum of 16 teams in all AVC events will be selected by
1 team for the host country
10 teams based on the final standing of the previous edition
5 teams from each of 5 zones (with a qualification tournament if needed)

Due to anticipated difficulty for national federations to field teams due to the COVID-19 pandemic, the AVC allowed two clubs from the same national federation to participate in the case that there are less than 8 federations enter the tournament. In the case of less than 16 entrants, the host is entitled to enter two teams. Only four national federations entered with Iran the only country to have one representative club.

Qualified associations

 Thailand as host country is entitled to enter two teams if they are less than 16 entrants. Their two berths are credited to have been attained as host nation and second placers in the 2019 championships.
 Under tournament regulations the top ten associations are reserved a berth. Only two from the ten participating associations in the 2019 championship elected to enter a team.
 National federations other than the host are entitled to send two teams if there are less than 8 entrants. Philippines and Kazakhstan, who also qualified a berth as the fourth-best finishing team in the 2019 edition, elected to send two teams.

Squads

Participating teams
The following teams were entered for the tournament.

 The PNVF fielded the Philippine national team as a club under the Rebisco name.
 The identity of the team is not known at the time of the draw and was listed as "PVL". The PNVF has invited the Premier Volleyball League to send its best finishing team in the 2021 Open Conference but all teams declined to enter. The PNVF will field a second team composing of national team players instead. The second team was named Team Choco Mucho.

Draw
The draw was held on 3 August 2021 in Bangkok, Thailand.

Venues
Matches will be held at the Terminal Hall – Terminal 21 Korat, an indoor arena within the Terminal 21

Preliminary round
All times are Indochina Time (UTC+07:00).
Pool A

|}

|}

Pool B

|}

|}

Final round
All times are Indochina Time (UTC+07:00).
 

Final seven

Quarterfinals

|}

5th–7th semifinals

|}

Semifinals

|}

5th place match

|}

3rd place match

|}

Final

|}

Final standing

Awards

Most Valuable Player
  Sana Anarkulova
Best Setter
  Nootsara Tomkom
Best Outside Spikers
  Nadiia Kodola
  Chatchu-on Moksri

Best Middle Blocker
  Pleumjit Thinkaow
  Pouran Zare
Best Opposite Spiker
  Kristina Belova
Best Libero
  Madina Beket

See also
2021 Asian Men's Club Volleyball Championship
2021 Asian Women's Volleyball Championship

References

Asian Women's Club Volleyball Championship
Asian Volleyball Club Championship
International volleyball competitions hosted by Thailand
2021 in Thai sport